Dimitry Viktorovich Vassiliev (born 26 December 1979) is a Russian former ski jumper who has competed at World Cup level from 1998 to 2021.

World Cup career
Vassiliev made his World Cup debut in the 1998/99 season. His best individual finish is second in Garmisch-Partenkirchen on 1 January 2001, and he has total of nine individual podiums and three team podiums as of January 2018.

His best finish at the Ski Jumping World Championships is fifth in the normal hill team competition in Oberstdorf on 20 February 2005, while his best individual finish is seventh in the large hill competition in Sapporo on 24 February 2007.

In the Ski Flying World Championships, his best finish is seventh in the team competitions in 2004 and 2006.

In the Winter Olympics, his best finish is eighth in the team competition and tenth in the individual normal hill competition in Pragelato on 12 February 2006.

Near-world record
On 15 February 2015 in Vikersund, Vassiliev flew to a distance of  but crashed hard onto near-flat ground. Despite not being an official ski flying world record, this remains the furthest distance ever reached in ski flying as of January 2018.

Summer world record
On 15 October 2016, Vassiliev jumped  in Sochi at the Russian National Championships, improving the five-year-old summer world record on a plastic surface.

Doping scandal
In 2001, during the Four Hills Tournament, Vassiliev tested positive for the substance Furosemide, which is a banned diuretic. He subsequently received a two-year ban from ski jumping.

World Cup results

Invalid ski jumping world record
The longest ski jump in history.

 Not recognized! Crash at world record distance.

References

External links

1979 births
Living people
Sportspeople from Ufa
Russian male ski jumpers
Olympic ski jumpers of Russia
Ski jumpers at the 2006 Winter Olympics
Ski jumpers at the 2014 Winter Olympics
Russian sportspeople in doping cases
Doping cases in ski jumping
Bashkir people